Johann Jakob Grynaeus or Gryner (October 1, 1540 – August 13, 1617) was a Swiss Protestant divine.

Life
Grynaeus was born in Bern. His father, Thomas Grynaeus (1512–1564), was for a time professor of ancient languages at Basel and Bern, but afterwards became pastor of Röteln in Baden. He was nephew of the eminent Humanist Simon Grynaeus.

Johann was educated at Basel, and in 1559 received an appointment as curate to his father. In 1563 he proceeded to Tübingen for the purpose of completing his theological studies, and in 1565 he returned to Rötteln as successor to his father. Here he felt compelled to abjure the Lutheran doctrine of the Lord's Supper, and to renounce the Formula of Concord.

Called in 1575 to the chair of Old Testament exegesis at Basel, he became involved in unpleasant controversy with Simon Sulzer and other champions of Lutheran orthodoxy; and in 1584 he was glad to accept an invitation to assist in the restoration of the University of Heidelberg.

Returning to Basel in 1586, after Simon Sulzer's death, as Antistes or  superintendent of the church there and as professor of the New Testament, he exerted for upwards of twenty-five years a considerable influence upon both the church and the state affairs of that community, and acquired a wide reputation as a skillful theologian of the school of Huldrych Zwingli. Amongst other labors he helped to reorganize the gymnasium in 1588. Five years before his death he became totally blind, but continued to preach and lecture till his death.  He died in Basel, aged 76.

Works

His many works include commentaries on various books of the Old and New Testament, Theologica theoremata et problemata (1588), and a collection of patristic literature entitled Monumenia S. patrum orthodoxographa (2 vols, fol., 1569).

References

External links
 
 
 
 

 Works of Johann Jakob Grynaeus at the Munich Digitization Center
 Universität Mannheim: Listing of works of Johann Jakob Grynaeus
 Griechischer Geist aus Basler Pressen – Preface of Johann Jacob Grynaeus to Johannes and Joachim Brandis, Basel, April 1, 1578

1540 births
1617 deaths
Swiss Calvinist and Reformed theologians
16th-century Swiss writers
17th-century Swiss people
16th-century Calvinist and Reformed theologians
17th-century Calvinist and Reformed theologians
People from Bern
Swiss blind people